State Highway 315 (SH 315) is a state highway in Texas that runs from Mount Enterprise northeast to Carthage.

Route description
SH 315 begins at a junction with US 259 in Mount Enterprise. The route travels to the northeast through eastern Rusk County, intersecting  FM 95 and  FM 840. Continuing to the northeast, the highway enters Panola County, in which it has junctions with  FM 348,  FM 1971, and  FM 1970 in the community of Clayton. SH 315 then enters Carthage, where it intersects  SH 149. The route travels through the western portion of Carthage before reaching its eastern terminus at  Bus. US 79.

History
This route was not built, and was removed from the state highway system by 1939. SH 315 was designated on April 1, 1939 on its current route. When originally constructed, the route between Mount Enterprise and the former community of Shiloh, approximately 5.8 miles to the east, was the first road in the state's Farm to Market system; the extension of this road in April caused the cancellation of SH 215, a highway that followed a similar routing to the current route. This route became part of SH 315 during the 1939 redescription of the state highway system.

Major intersections

References

315
Transportation in Rusk County, Texas
Transportation in Panola County, Texas